Harwich was a parliamentary constituency represented in the House of Commons of the Parliament of the United Kingdom. Until its abolition for the 2010 general election it elected one Member of Parliament (MP) by the first past the post system of election.

History 
The Parliamentary Borough of Harwich had sent two members to Parliament since it was founded in 1604. Under the Reform Act of 1867 its representation was reduced to one, and in 1885 the Parliamentary Borough was abolished and replaced with a Division of the County of Essex (later a County Constituency) under the Redistribution of Seats Act 1885.  For a long period of time it was known as a "Treasury borough" due to the control the Treasury had over its elections. 

The constituency was abolished  for the 2010 general election by the Fifth Periodic Review of Westminster constituencies, being succeeded by the new constituency of Clacton and part of the new constituency of Harwich and North Essex.

Boundaries and boundary changes

1885–1918: The Municipal Borough of Harwich, and parts of the Sessional Divisions of Lexden and Winstree.  Non-resident freeholders of the Parliamentary Borough of Colchester, which constituted the Municipal Borough thereof, were also entitled to vote.

Formally known as the North Eastern or Harwich Division of Essex, incorporating the abolished Parliamentary Borough of Harwich and extending southwards and westwards to include the towns of Clacton and Brightlingsea and the rural areas surrounding Colchester.

1918–1950: The Municipal Borough of Harwich, the Urban Districts of Brightlingsea, Clacton, Frinton-on-Sea, Walton-on-the-Naze, and Wivenhoe, and the Rural District of Tendring.

Western, rural parts included in the new Colchester Division of Essex.

1950–1983: The Municipal Borough of Harwich, the Urban Districts of Brightlingsea, Clacton, Frinton and Walton, and Wivenhoe, and the Rural District of Tendring.

No changes.

1983–1997: The District of Tendring wards of Beaumont and Thorpe, Bockings Elm, Bradfield Wrabness and Wix, Frinton, Golf Green, Great and Little Oakley, Harwich East, Harwich East Central, Harwich West, Harwich West Central, Haven, Holland and Kirby, Little Clacton, Ramsey, Rush Green, Southcliff, St Bartholomew's, St James, St John's, St Mary's, St Osyth, Tendring and Weeley, and Walton.

Western parts, including Brightlingsea and Wivenhoe, included in the new County Constituency of North Colchester.

1997–2010: The District of Tendring wards of Beaumont and Thorpe, Bockings Elm, Frinton, Golf Green, Great and Little Oakley, Harwich East, Harwich East Central, Harwich West, Harwich West Central, Haven, Holland and Kirby, Little Clacton, Ramsey, Rush Green, St Bartholomew's, St James, St John's, St Mary's, Southcliff, and Walton.

A further western slice, including St Osyth, added to the new County Constituency of North Essex.

Following the Boundary Commission's Fifth Periodic Review of Westminster constituencies, Parliament radically altered some constituencies and created new ones to allow for changes in population. Consequently, the constituency of Harwich was abolished. The majority of the constituency, including Clacton, Frinton and Walton, formed the new County Constituency of Clacton, and Harwich and surrounding areas were included in the new County Constituency of Harwich and North Essex.

Members of Parliament
Constituency founded 1604

1604 to 1660

1660–1868

1868–2010

Elections

Elections in the 1830s
Herries was appointed Secretary at War, requiring a by-election.

Elections in the 1840s

 

 

 

 

 

Attwood's election was declared void on petition due to bribery by his agents, causing a by-election.

Elections in the 1850s
Hobhouse was elevated to the peerage, becoming 1st Baron Broughton and causing a by-election.

 

Prinsep's election was declared void on petition due to bribery, causing a by-election.

 

Crawford's election was declared void, due to polling being closed prematurely, and the seat's writ was suspended in July 1851. A by-election was called the next year.

Kelly resigned to contest a by-election in East Suffolk, causing a by-election.

 

 

Peacocke's election was declared void on petition, due to corrupt practices, causing a by-election.

 

 

 

 

 

 

Warburton's death caused a by-election.

 

 

Bagshaw's resignation caused a by-election.

Elections in the 1860s
Campbell succeeded to the peerage, becoming Lord Stratheden and Campbell, and causing a by-election.

 

 

Seat reduced to one member

Elections in the 1870s

Elections in the 1880s

Elections in the 1890s

Elections in the 1900s

Elections in the 1910s

General Election 1914–15:

Another General Election was required to take place before the end of 1915. The political parties had been making preparations for an election to take place and by July 1914, the following candidates had been selected; 
Unionist: Harry Newton
Liberal: Edward Aylmer Digby

Elections in the 1920s

Elections in the 1930s

Elections in the 1940s 
General Election 1939–40:
Another General Election was required to take place before the end of 1940. The political parties had been making preparations for an election to take place from 1939 and by the end of this year, the following candidates had been selected; 
Liberal National: Stanley Holmes
Labour: Ald. Joseph Hewitt

Elections in the 1950s

Elections in the 1960s

Elections in the 1970s

Elections in the 1980s

Elections in the 1990s

This was the Referendum Party's best result in the election.

Elections in the 2000s

See also
List of parliamentary constituencies in Essex

References

Constituencies of the Parliament of the United Kingdom disestablished in 2010
Parliamentary constituencies in Essex (historic)
Harwich